Norman William Paramor (15 May 1914 – 9 September 1979), known professionally as Norrie Paramor, was a British record producer, composer, arranger, pianist, bandleader, and orchestral conductor. He is best known for his work with Cliff Richard and the Shadows, both together and separately, steering their early careers and producing and arranging most of their material from the late 1950s to the early 1970s. Paramor was a composer of studio albums, theatrical productions, and film scores.

Producer 
Although the term "producer" was not in circulation at the time Paramor started producing records (the usual term being Artiste and Repertoire Manager, or A&R man), he effectively began this role in 1952 when he became Recording Director for EMI's Columbia Records. As well as being producer for Cliff Richard and the Shadows, he produced records for Ruby Murray, Eddie Calvert, Michael Holliday, Helen Shapiro, Frank Ifield, Frankie Vaughan, the Mudlarks, the Avons, and Ricky Valance, among others. Per The Guinness Book of British Hit Singles, Paramor and George Martin his opposite number at EMI sister label Parlophone jointly held the record for having produced the most UK Number 1 hit singles until Martin produced "Candle in the Wind 97" for Sir Elton John, 18 years after Paramor died. This ignores The Beatles' second single "Please Please Me", produced by Martin, which was recognised as a number one hit by every other publicly available chart of the time, but not by Record Retailer and therefore not by British Hit Singles, which uses that chart as its source from 1960.

In the late 1960s he left EMI to form his own production company.

Composer
In 1955, he formed Norman Paramor & His Orchestra and in 1956 they recorded one of the biggest-selling albums from the Capitol of the World import series, released by another subsidiary of EMI, Capitol Records: In London in Love, featuring the soprano Patricia Clarke, who was used in many subsequent selling albums. This became his trademark orchestral signature sound, and was featured on Autumn, Amor Amor, In London, In Love Again, Warm and Willing, My Fair Lady, and Moods, among others.

Paramor also composed music for films, including Serious Charge (1959), Expresso Bongo (1959), The Young Ones (1961), No My Darling Daughter (1961), The Frightened City (1961), A Pair of Briefs (1962), Two and Two Make Six (1962), The Wild and the Willing (1962), The Fast Lady (1963), Doctor in Distress (1963), Father Came Too! (1963), and My Lover, My Son (1970). He co-wrote the 1962 hit song "Let's Talk About Love" for Helen Shapiro.

In 1962, Paramor was the subject of "A Tribute to Norrie Paramor" by David Frost on the satirical British television programme That Was the Week That Was for, the sketch claimed, taking undeserved songwriting credits and royalties, "writing ordinary tunes with ordinary words" and "[making] everything ordinary."

In 1968, he was the musical director for the Eurovision Song Contest, staged at the Royal Albert Hall, the first to be broadcast in colour. He also conducted the UK entry that year, "Congratulations", performed by Cliff Richard.

In 1970, he became the resident conductor for BBC Midland Radio Orchestra, a post he held until his death. In 1977, Paramor and his orchestra recorded with the Shadows for a final time, on the track "Return to the Alamo".

Death 
Paramor died on 9 September 1979 at the age of 65, a fortnight after Cliff Richard had returned to the top of the UK Singles Chart with "We Don't Talk Anymore", his first number one single in more than ten years. Paramor and Richard had worked together professionally from 1958 to 1972.

See also
Just We Two, recording by Norrie Paramor and his orchestra

References

External links
 

1914 births
1979 deaths
Deaths from cancer in England
English conductors (music)
British male conductors (music)
English music arrangers
English record producers
English songwriters
Eurovision Song Contest conductors
20th-century British conductors (music)
20th-century English musicians
20th-century British male musicians
20th-century British musicians
British male songwriters